Anne Garefino (born July 1, 1959) is an American film and television producer.  She is the co-executive producer (with Trey Parker and Matt Stone) of the long-running series South Park, and the co-executive producer of the Broadway musical The Book of Mormon (with Scott Rudin). Continuing her work on South Park, she was the executive producer of the film South Park: Bigger, Longer & Uncut, which received an Academy Award nomination for Best Original Song. She also was the executive producer of the film Team America: World Police.

Raised in Lambertville, New Jersey, she graduated from Boston College, where she majored in finance. She received her MFA at the AFI Conservatory in Los Angeles.

She has been nominated for thirteen and won five Primetime Emmy Awards for her work on South Park, and won both a Tony Award and a Grammy Award for her work on The Book of Mormon.

References

External links
 

1959 births
Television producers from New York City
American women television producers
Carroll School of Management alumni
AFI Conservatory alumni
Grammy Award winners
Living people
People from Lambertville, New Jersey
Place of birth missing (living people)
Primetime Emmy Award winners
Tony Award winners
Television producers from New Jersey
21st-century American women